Robert 'Rob' Derek Large (born 23 October 1981) is an English cricketer. Large is a right-handed batsman who bowls right-arm medium pace. He was born at Aylesbury, Buckinghamshire.

Large represented the Northamptonshire Cricket Board in a single List A match against the Leicestershire Cricket Board in the 1st round of the 2002 Cheltenham & Gloucester Trophy which was played in 2001. In his only List A match he scored 27 runs.

References

External links
Rob Large at Cricinfo
Rob Large at CricketArchive

1981 births
Living people
Sportspeople from Aylesbury
People from Buckinghamshire
English cricketers
Northamptonshire Cricket Board cricketers